The Oriental may refer to:

"The Oriental", a song by Status Quo from their 2002 album Heavy Traffic
Oriental Hotel (disambiguation)
Oriental Theatre (disambiguation)

See also
Orient (disambiguation)